Krispy may refer to:

"Krispy" (song), song from album Due Season by hip-hop artist Kia Shine
Krispy (cracker), a saltine or soda cracker

See also
 Krispy Kreme, an American doughnut company
 Krispy Krunchy Chicken, an American fried chicken company